Internal pterygoid is the obsolete attribution for medial pterygoid, and refers to:

Medial pterygoid muscle
Medial pterygoid nerve